Streptomyces brasiliensis is a bacterial species of the genus Streptomyces that has been isolated from soil. S. brasiliensis produces neomycin. S. brasiliensis sporulates when it is cultured with galactose and glutamic acid as carbon and nitrogen sources. The colonies are red/pink or red/orange, and the pigment is not permeable. Sucrose nitrate synthesize AGAR: gas filaments slightly pink, white. Spore filaments are non-helical. They are ovoid, spherical.

See also 
 List of Streptomyces species

References

Further reading

External links
Type strain of Streptomyces brasiliensis at BacDive -  the Bacterial Diversity Metadatabase

brasiliensis
Bacteria described in 1986